Protoporphyrinogen IX dehydrogenase (menaquinone) (HemG) is an enzyme with systematic name protoporphyrinogen IX:menaquinone oxidoreductase. This enzyme catalyses the following chemical reaction

 protoporphyrinogen IX + 3 menaquinone   protoporphyrin IX + 3 menaquinol

This enzyme enables Escherichia coli to synthesize heme in both aerobic and anaerobic environments.

References

External links 
 

EC 1.3.5